Manny Guevara, also known by the stage name Manny Streetz, is a Filipino-American radio & TV personality, actor, songwriter, film producer, television producer, and record producer.

Career

Streetz is professionally also known as "Manny on the Streetz" as an on-air personality with the Ryan Seacrest radio morning show, On Air with Ryan Seacrest, on the top rated top billing radio station in the world, 102.7 KIIS-FM. He was also a radio personality at 97.9 Radio NOW (WNWW) Jacksonville, FL on his own radio show. He also hosts the SoCal Community Council radio show which airs on numerous iHeartRadio stations including 102.7 KIIS-FM, Real 92.3 and KLAC. He's guest-starred on TV Shows like Dollhouse starring Eliza Dushku and Sam & Cat with Teen Pop Superstar Ariana Grande. He has also appeared in national commercials for Budlight, Buffalo Wild Wings, Turbo Tax and AMP Energy Drinks. As of December 2017, he is now a host at Radio Disney.

Streetz has worked on music projects ranging from Raven-Symoné, Frankie J, Interscope Recording Artist Ya Boy, Samantha Jade, School Boy Humor, Hollywood Records' band "Allstar weekend", and NMD (Howie D of BSB's girl group) among others. Manny has also worked with Multi-Grammy winning songwriter Diane Warren and producers J& Sweet who have written for Jennifer Lopez, as well as teamed up with his brothers, Marvz & Mike Bangum to form the Beat Kadetz. Other prominent songwriters and producers Streetz has worked with include Andre Merritt, Rob. A, Silkk the Shocker, Eddie Galan of Mach 1 Music, Marc Nelson, David Kater, Eric D-Lux of KPWR, Ryan and Smitty, Danja Handz, Da Internz and Nick James.

As an actor, Manny has appeared as a co-star in the short-lived ABC Studios TV series Mixology. The series was co-created by Jon Lucas & Scott Moore, who also serves as co-executive producers with Ryan Seacrest and Nina Wass for Ryan Seacrest Productions and ABC Studios. The series was greenlighted by ABC. Manny will also be a co-star in the comedy Legit for FXX, created by Jim Jefferies, and will co-star in Playing House (TV series).
In fall of 2014, Manny Streetz was one of 20 finalists who were chosen out of over 7500 submissions to participate in the well known ABC Diversity Talent Showcase produced by ABC Studios, where they will be mentored by ABC Casting Execs such as, Keli Lee, Claudia Lyon, Jessie, Patricia Yuen Kern, Peachy, and John Villacorta.

As a Film Producer, Manny executive produced the short film, Free Lunch, with Ricky Horne, Jr. and Cory Hardrict, which won "Best Short Film" at the North Carolina Black Film Festival.  He is also developing several television projects & webseries under his production company Silent String Entertainment.

Release 
Gnome Alone, The film was originally set for an October 13, 2017 release, but on October 12, 2017, the film was pushed back to March 2, 2018. However, the film was not released on that date. The film was finally released on April 20, 2018 in Latin America, Europe, and Asia. It was later announced to be released on October 19, 2018 via Netflix in the United States.

Charming, The film was postponed for an undisclosed time from 2017 to the spring of 2018, despite the filming, recording and production having been completed in December 2017. Although Vanguard Animation never officially announced a release date, it was released on April 20, 2018, in Spain and throughout the year in Europe and Africa.

It was released in the United Kingdom on August 2, 2019.

Personal life
Manny Streetz is the son of Vicenta, a missionary, and Manuel, a retired Naval Officer and retiring United States Postal Service Mail Handler. Streetz was raised in Jacksonville, Florida. He studied music business at Valencia College in Orlando, FL and began his career in entertainment right after college.

He is married to Angela Guevara and has three children, Michael Guzzo, Isabel and Joshua and reside in Ventura County.

Discography

Films

Television

References

External links 
 
 Manny Streetz on 102.7 KIIS-FM Website
 Official Silent String Entertainment Website

1976 births
Living people
Singers from California
Hip hop record producers
American hip hop record producers
Songwriters from California
American male songwriters
21st-century American singers
21st-century American male singers